The timeline of events in the War in Somalia (2009–).

Incumbents 
 President: Sharif Sheikh Ahmed 
 Prime Minister: 
 until 24 September: Omar Abdirashid Ali Sharmarke 
 24 September-1 November: Abdiwahid Elmi Gonjeh
 starting 1 November: Mohamed Abdullahi Mohamed

See also
 2010 timeline of the War in Somalia

References

 
Somalia
2010s in Somalia
Years of the 21st century in Somalia
Somalia